Denis Pozder (born 11 December 1989) is a Bosnian-German professional footballer who plays as a forward for Mittelrheinliga club Borussia Freialdenhoven.

References

External links
 
 

1989 births
Sportspeople from Mostar
German people of Bosnia and Herzegovina descent
Naturalized citizens of Germany
Living people
German footballers
Association football forwards
MSV Duisburg II players
FC Wegberg-Beeck players
Alemannia Aachen players
FC Vaslui players
SSVg Velbert players
SV Eintracht Trier 05 players
FC Den Bosch players
FK Željezničar Sarajevo players
KFC Uerdingen 05 players
SC Young Fellows Juventus players
Oberliga (football) players
3. Liga players
Liga I players
Regionalliga players
Eerste Divisie players
Premier League of Bosnia and Herzegovina players
Swiss 1. Liga (football) players
Swiss Promotion League players
2. Liga Interregional players
German expatriate footballers
Expatriate footballers in France
German expatriate sportspeople in France
Expatriate footballers in Romania
German expatriate sportspeople in Romania
Expatriate footballers in the Netherlands
German expatriate sportspeople in the Netherlands
Expatriate footballers in Bosnia and Herzegovina
German expatriate sportspeople in Bosnia and Herzegovina
Expatriate footballers in Switzerland
German expatriate sportspeople in Switzerland